Lechia Gdańsk is a Polish rugby union team playing in the Rugby Ekstraliga. It is one of the oldest and most successful teams in Polish rugby.

History 
In early days of Polish rugby in 1950's Gdańsk was one of the epicentres of the sport, mainly of interest among students. The very first 2 teams were "AZS Politechnika", the team representing the Gdańsk Polytechnic and the "Technikum Wychowania Fizycznego" team, the team of the Technical Sports College, abbreviated to "TWF". The main driving force behind the TWF team was a man named Henryk Hodiak. When in 1955 rugby became recognised by the Minister of Sport and a national rugby federation was set up, it allowed the start registration process of teams. When "AZS Politechnika" became one of the first teams to register, Hodiak started to look to register his own team in one of the local sports clubs. Thanks to Sławomir Zieleniewski, an activist at BKS Lechia and a lecturer at TWF, and Stanisław Michowski, the headmaster of TWF, talks began with Stefan Kowalski, the director of Lechia.

The club was officially set up on 1 May 1956. The bulk of team was composed of TWF students, strengthened by Lechia players from other sections of the club. The first match was against the aforementioned Politechnic. The friendly match took place on 21 September 1956 with a disputed result of 14:0 win over AZS, which was disputed due to claims that no one was keeping score.

Poland's first ever rugby season was in 1956 between September and December. There was no national league but only 5 regional divisions which were meant to determine who shall play in the top flight which was to be established later on. Lechia's first official match was played against Stal Gdańsk on 16 September 1956 and finished in a 6:6 draw. Few days later on 1 November Lechia won their first official match 6:3, away against Goplania Inowrocław.

After that Lechia began to play in national competitions, and whereas most other teams quickly folded after the initial first few seasons, Lechia went to win numerous titles, and remain to this day the only team never to have been relegated from the top division.

Honours

Senior
Polish Championship Winners (13): 1960, 1961, 1970, 1994, 1995, 1996, 1998, 1999–00, 2000–01, 2001–02, 2011–12, 2012–13, 2013–14
Polish Championship Runners-up (11): 1963, 1971–72, 1972–73, 1981–82, 1985, 1986, 1991, 1993, 1997, 2009–10, 2015–16
Polish Championship 3rd place (15): 1962, 1967, 1968, 1969, 1973–74, 1976–77, 1980–81, 1987, 1988, 1998–99, 2003–04, 2007–08, 2008–09, 2010–11, 2014–15
Polish Cup Winners (12): 1977, 1984, 1985, 1986, 1994, 1996, 1997, 2004, 2005, 2006, 2008, 2013

Junior
Polish Championship Winners: 1960, 1967, 1980, 1998
Polish Championship Runners-up: 1959, 1961, 1962, 1976, 2012
Polish Championship 3rd place: 1988, 1991, 1992, 1996

League History 

Notes

Rugby sevens

RC Lechia Gdańsk sevens is the rugby sevens section of Lechia Gdańsk formed in 1996. The team is one of the most successful in Polands Rugby 7's championships, finishing in the top 3 in every season they have participated.

The Lechia Gdańsk sevens team was created to take part in the newly formed Polish Rugby 7's Championships which took place in 1996. In the first championship Lechia performed strongly finishing in 3rd place, repeating the feat the following year. Despite Lechia starting strongly in the Polish championships first two seasons, the team was removed from the Lechia Rugby club from 1998 until returning in 2009. Upon Lechias return the team in 2009, the team once again showed their quality finishing as runners-up.

Lechia won their first Polish Rugby 7's championship the following year in 2010, beating AZS-AWF Warsaw in the final. This win saw the toppling of AZS-AWF Warsaw being Polands dominant team and saw Lechia rising to take their place. Lechia won 7 championships in a row from 2010–2016 until their domination came to an end with defeat to Posnania in the final in 2017. Lechia returned to the top of the sport the following year, winning a record equalling 8th championship (shared with AZS-AWF Warsaw) after a closely fought final with Posnania.

After their record equalling season, the Lechia sevens team were once again removed from the league system for the next three years, returning again in 2021 when they secured a third-place finish.

Honours

Polish Rugby Sevens Championship
Winners (8): 2010, 2011, 2012, 2013, 2014, 2015, 2016, 2018
Runners-up (2): 2009, 2017
Third place (3): 1996, 1997, 2021–22

See also
Rugby union in Poland
Rugby Ekstraliga

References

External links 
  Official Club website
  Polish Rugby Association - Extraliga

Polish rugby union teams
Lechia Gdańsk
1956 establishments in Poland